Orthogastropoda was a major taxonomic grouping of snails and slugs, an extremely large subclass within the huge class Gastropoda according to the older taxonomy of the Gastropoda (Ponder & Lindberg, 1997).

This taxon is no longer used according to the taxonomy of the Gastropoda by Bouchet & Rocroi, 2005.

Ponder and Lindberg (1997) in the book The Southern Synthesis, showed the Orthogastropoda as one of two subclasses of the Gastropoda, the other subclass being a very much smaller group called the Eogastropoda, which contained only 5 families of true limpets.

This subclass, Orthogastropoda, which one perhaps could call the true snails, was defined most concisely as all gastropods which were not members of Patellogastropoda, the true limpets.

The Orthogastropoda appeared to form a clade which was supported by unambiguous synapomorphies. These synapomorphies (a series of characteristics that appear in its members but not in the other forms it diverged from) were the identifying characteristics of the clade.

Some of the characteristics were:
eyes with a vitreous body on eyestalks.
paired jaws, with their position free from the buccal mass
a single kidney on the right side of pericardium
a flexoglossate radula (with a flexible radular membrane). The radula is the snail's tongue, used as a rasping tool.
unpaired osphradium (olfactory organ).
lateral ciliated zones of osphradium
a single left hypobranchial gland (on organ at gill, which releases secretions, such as the reddish dye Tyrian purple).
an unpaired ctenidium (a comblike respiratory structure in certain mollusks)

Taxonomy 
The following is based on the somewhat out-dated taxonomy of the Gastropoda (Ponder & Lindberg, 1997). For the most up-to-date system of gastropod taxonomy, please see Taxonomy of the Gastropoda (Bouchet & Rocroi, 2005).

Superorder Cocculiniformia Haszprunar, 1987

Superfamily Cocculinoidea Dall, 1882
Superfamily Lepetelloidea Dall, 1882 (deep sea limpets)

Superorder incertae sedis (Hot Vent Taxa)

Order Neomphaloida Sitnikova & Starobogatov, 1983
Superfamily Neomphaloidea McLean, 1981 (hydrothermal vent limpets)
Superfamily Peltospiroidea McLean, 1989

Superorder Vetigastropoda Salvini-Plawen, 1989 (limpets)
Superfamily Fissurelloidea Flemming, 1822 (keyhole limpets)
Superfamily Haliotoidea Rafinesque, 1815 (abalones)
Superfamily Lepetodriloidea McLean, 1988 (hydrothermal vent limpets)
Superfamily Pleurotomarioidea Swainson, 1840 (slit shells)
Superfamily Seguenzioidea Verrill, 1884
Superfamily Trochoidea Rafinesque, 1815 (top shells)

Superorder Neritaemorphi Koken, 1896

Order Neritopsina Cox & Knight, 1960
Superfamily Neritoidea Lamarck, 1809

Superorder Caenogastropoda Cox, 1960

Order Architaenioglossa Haller, 1890
Superfamily Ampullarioidea J.E. Gray, 1824
Superfamily Cyclophoroidea J.E. Gray, 1847 (terrestrial)
Order Sorbeoconcha Ponder & Lindberg, 1997
Suborder Cerithiimorpha Golikov & Starobogatov, 1975
Superfamily Spanionematoidea
Suborder Hypsogastropoda Ponder & Lindberg, 1997
Infraorder Littorinimorpha Golikov & Starobogatov, 1975
Superfamily Calyptraeoidea Lamarck, 1809
Superfamily Capuloidea J. Fleming, 1822
Superfamily Carinarioidea Blainville, 1818
Superfamily Cingulopsoidea Fretter & Patil, 1958
Superfamily Cypraeoidea Rafinesque, 1815 (cowries)
Superfamily Ficoidea Meek, 1864
Superfamily Laubierinoidea Warén & Bouchet, 1990
Superfamily Littorinoidea (Children), 1834 (periwinkles)
Superfamily Naticoidea Forbes, 1838 (moon shells)
Superfamily Rissooidea J.E. Gray, 1847 (Risso shells)
Superfamily Stromboidea Rafinesque, 1815 (true conchs)
Superfamily Tonnoidea Suter, 1913
Superfamily Trivioidea Troschel, 1863
Superfamily Vanikoroidea J.E. Gray, 1840
Superfamily Velutinoidea J.E. Gray, 1840
Superfamily Vermetoidea Rafinesque, 1815 (worm shells)
Superfamily Xenophoroidea Troschel, 1852 (carrier shells)
Infraorder Neogastropoda Thiele, 1929
Superfamily Buccinoidea (whelks, false tritions)
Superfamily Cancellarioidea Forbes & Hanley, 1851
Superfamily Conoidea Rafinesque, 1815
Superfamily Muricoidea Rafinesque, 1815
Infraorder Ptenoglossa J.E. Gray, 1853
Superfamily Eulimoidea Philippi, 1853
Superfamily Janthinoidea Lamarck, 1812
Superfamily Triphoroidea J.E. Gray, 1847
Suborder Discopoda P. Fischer, 1884 - sometimes included in Cerithiimorpha
Superfamily Campaniloidea Douvillé, 1904
Superfamily Cerithioidea Férussac, 1822
Suborder Murchisoniina Cox & Knight, 1960
Superfamily Loxonematoidea Koken, 1889

Superorder Heterobranchia J.E. Gray, 1840

Order Heterostropha P. Fischer, 1885
Superfamily Architectonicoidea J.E. Gray, 1840
Family Architectonicidae Gray, 1850
Superfamily Omalogyroidea G.O. Sars, 1878
Superfamily Pyramidelloidea J.E. Gray, 1840
Superfamily Rissoelloidea J.E. Gray, 1850
Superfamily Valvatoidea J.E. Gray, 1840
Order Opisthobranchia Milne-Edwards, 1848 
Suborder Nudibranchia Blainville, 1814 (nudibranchs)
Infraorder Anthobranchia Férussac, 1819
Superfamily Doridoidea Rafinesque, 1815
Superfamily Doridoxoidea Bergh, 1900
Superfamily Onchidoridoidea Alder & Hancock, 1845
Superfamily Polyceroidea Alder & Hancock, 1845
Infraorder Cladobranchia Willan & Morton, 1984
Superfamily Aeolidioidea J.E. Gray, 1827
Superfamily Arminoidea Rafinesque, 1814
Superfamily Dendronotoidea Allman, 1845
Superfamily Metarminoidea Odhner in Franc, 1968
Suborder Anaspidea P. Fischer, 1883 (sea hares)
Superfamily Akeroidea Pilsbry, 1893
Superfamily Aplysioidea Lamarck, 1809
Suborder Cephalaspidea P. Fischer, 1883
Superfamily Acteonoidea D'Orbigny, 1835
Superfamily Bulloidea Lamarck, 1801
Superfamily Cylindrobulloidea Thiele, 1931
Superfamily Diaphanoidea Odhner, 1914
Superfamily Haminoeoidea Pilsbry, 1895
Superfamily Philinoidea J.E. Gray, 1850
Superfamily Ringiculoidea Philippi, 1853
Suborder Gymnosomata Blainville, 1824 (sea angels)
Suborder Notaspidea P. Fischer, 1883
Superfamily Pleurobranchoidea Férussac, 1822
Superfamily Tylodinoidea J.E. Gray, 1847
Suborder Sacoglossa Von Ihering, 1876
Superfamily Oxynooidea H. & A. Adams, 1854
Suborder Thecosomata Blainville, 1824 (sea butterflies)
Infraorder Euthecosomata
Superfamily Limacinoidea
Superfamily Cavolinioidea
Infraorder Pseudothecosomata
Superfamily Peraclidoidea
Superfamily Cymbulioidea
Order Pulmonata Cuvier in Blainville, 1814 (pulmonates)
Subinfraorder Orthurethra
Superfamily Achatinelloidea Gulick, 1873
Superfamily Cochlicopoidea Pilsbry, 1900
Superfamily Partuloidea Pilsbry, 1900
Superfamily Pupilloidea Turton, 1831
Subinfraorder Sigmurethra
Superfamily Acavoidea Pilsbry, 1895
Superfamily Achatinoidea Swainson, 1840
Superfamily Aillyoidea Baker, 1960
Superfamily Arionoidea J.E. Gray in Turnton, 1840
Superfamily Buliminoidea Clessin, 1879
Superfamily Camaenoidea Pilsbry, 1895
Superfamily Clausilioidea  Mörch, 1864
Superfamily Dyakioidea Gude & Woodward, 1921
Superfamily Gastrodontoidea Tryon, 1866
Superfamily Helicoidea Rafinesque, 1815
Superfamily Helixarionoidea Bourguignat, 1877
Superfamily Limacoidea Rafinesque, 1815
Superfamily Oleacinoidea H. & A. Adams, 1855
Superfamily Orthalicoidea Albers-Martens, 1860
Superfamily Plectopylidoidea Moellendorf, 1900
Superfamily Polygyroidea Pilsbry, 1894
Superfamily Punctoidea Morse, 1864
Superfamily Rhytidoidea Pilsbry, 1893
Superfamily Sagdidoidera Pilsbry, 1895
Superfamily Staffordioidea Thiele, 1931
Superfamily Streptaxoidea J.E. Gray, 1806
Superfamily Strophocheiloidea Thiele, 1926
Superfamily Trigonochlamydoidea Hese, 1882
Superfamily Zonitoidea Mörch, 1864
Infraorder Acteophila Dall, 1885
Superfamily Melampoidea Stimpson, 1851
Infraorder Trimusculiformes Minichev & Starobogatov, 1975
Superfamily Trimusculoidea Zilch, 1959
Infraorder Stylommatophora A. Schmidt, 1856 (land snails)
Suborder Basommatophora Keferstein in Bronn, 1864 (freshwater pulmonates)
Superfamily Acroloxoidea Thiele, 1931
Superfamily Amphiboloidea J.E. Gray, 1840
Superfamily Chilinoidea H. & A. Adams, 1855
Superfamily Glacidorboidea Ponder, 1986
Superfamily Lymnaeoidea Rafinesque, 1815
Superfamily Planorboidea Rafinesque, 1815
Superfamily Siphonarioidea J.E. Gray, 1840
Suborder Eupulmonata Haszprunar & Huber, 1990
Suborder Systellommatophora Pilsbry, 1948
Superfamily Onchidioidea Rafinesque, 1815
Superfamily Otinoidea H. & A. Adams, 1855
Superfamily Rathouisioidea Sarasin, 1889

References

 Gastropods on Land by G.M. Barker. Chapter 1 available online in PDF format
 

Obsolete gastropod taxa
Patellogastropoda
Mollusc subclasses

ru:Брюхоногие#Классификация